The Rich Bride, also translated as The Country Bride, is a 1937 Soviet adventure film directed by Ivan Pyryev.

Plot 
In love with each other, the tractor driver Pavlo and the collective farmer Marina work together to harvest the harvest at the local collective farm. But Pavlo has a rival - bookkeeper Kovynko, also in love with Marina.

Starring 
 Marina Ladynina as Maria Alexandrovna "Marinka" Lukash
 Boris Bezgin as Pavlo Zgara
 Ivan Lyubeznov as Alexei Kovinko
 Stepan Shagaida as Sidor Vassilyevich Balaba, the barber
 Fyodor Kurikhin as Naum Vassilyevich "Granddad" Vorkun (as F.N. Kurikhin)
 Anna Dmokhovskaya as Palaga Fedorovna, work forewoman
 Aleksandr Antonov as Danilo Petrovich, work foreman
 Ivan Matveyev as Senka, tractor driver
 Lyubov Sveshnikova as Froska, worker
 Dmitriy Kapka 
 Ivan Bondar
 Nataliya Gebdovskaya

References

External links 

1937 adventure films
1937 films
Films scored by Isaak Dunayevsky
1930s Russian-language films
Soviet adventure films
Soviet black-and-white films